

Gralyn Estate is an Australian winery at Wilyabrup, in the Margaret River wine region of Western Australia.  Established in 1975 on a beef-farming property, it is well known for high quality fortified wines, and also make premium dry reds, chardonnay and a selection of sweet wines. Gralyn Estate opened Margaret River’s first Cellar Door in 1978.

Awards
In April 2022 Gralyn Estate won the prestigious “Wine of the Year” with their Artizan Rare Muscat at the London Wine Competition. 
 Australian wine
 List of wineries in Western Australia
 Western Australian wine

References

Notes

Bibliography

External links
Gralyn Estate – official site

Food and drink companies established in 1975
Wilyabrup, Western Australia
Wineries in Western Australia
1975 establishments in Australia